The Tarnac Nine are a French group of nine alleged anarchist saboteurs: Mathieu Burnel, Julien Coupat, Bertrand Deveaux, Manon Glibert, Gabrielle Hallez, Elsa Hauck, Yildune Lévy, Benjamin Rosoux and Aria Thomas.  They were arrested on November 11, 2008 in an operation carried out by French police throughout Paris, Rouen and particularly Tarnac, rural France.  The operation resulted in twenty arrests, of whom eleven were released almost immediately afterward.  The remaining nine who were held for questioning, and who on November 15 were variously listed as suspects and accused of crimes, then became known as the Tarnac Nine.  One year later, Glibert's husband Christophe Becker was also arrested in Tarnac in connection with the matter; as a result, the group is also sometimes known as the Tarnac Ten.

The group were "accused of 'criminal association for the purposes of terrorist activity' on the grounds that they were to have participated in the sabotage of overhead electrical lines on France's national railways."  In late October and early November 2008, horseshoe-shaped iron bars were used to obstruct power cables of the TGV railways at locations throughout France, resulting in delays for about 160 trains.  In particular, one instance of this occurred on November 7–8, 2008, in Dhuisy, Seine-et-Marne, near Paris.  On the same night, Coupat and his partner Lévy were driving in the area, under police surveillance.  Three days later, the arrests were made.  On April 12, 2018, following a long and complex legal case, the group were acquitted of the most serious charges brought against them, including sabotage and conspiracy, with some members being convicted on lesser charges.

Background and Tarnac

The original group of nine consists of five women and four men, aged from 22 through 34 at the time of the arrests, who are generally well-educated.  Coupat was a former graduate student and is a political writer, having contributed to a philosophical journal called Tiqqun.  Coupat's partner, Lévy, is an archaeologist.  Others have been described as "a Swiss sitcom actor (Thomas), a distinguished clarinettist (Glibert), a student nurse (Hallez, an ex-partner of Coupat's) and Benjamin Rosoux, a University of Edinburgh graduate who runs the (Tarnac's) grocer's shop and its adjoining bar-restaurant."  At the time of the arrests, Deveaux and Hauck were also described as beginning graduate students in sociology and English, respectively.

The nine were part of a larger group of like-minded, left-wing young people who sought to relocate to a rural area in order to live simply and communally, shunning consumerism.  Consequently, they scouted locations and settled on Tarnac, both for its rural setting and also for the similar political orientation of the local residents: in Limousin, Tarnac is part of an area of France which has a long history with communism and the French Resistance of World War II, having successfully avoided German occupation.  Upon moving in, the group began operating a disused shop and bar, and began community initiatives such as a film club and food delivery services for elderly locals.  The newcomers were generally well-liked by their neighbors.  On the other hand, authorities have rejected this positive image of the group, instead describing them as an anarchist terrorist cell who sought a rural location as a base of operations and who shunned cell phones in order to avoid detection by authorities.

Legal case

From the time of the arrests until 2018, the group had been involved in complex legal proceedings in which the members faced various criminal charges related to terrorism, sabotage, conspiracy, and refusal to submit to biological sampling.  Four of the nine were released shortly after the arrests; Glibert, Hallez and Rosoux were later released on December 2, 2008, and Lévy was released on January 16, 2009.  Coupat, who was presumed by the prosecution to be the group's leader, was released on May 28, 2009.  In late November 2009, a further arrest was made: Christophe Becker, husband of Glibert, was arrested in Tarnac on related suspicions, and released shortly thereafter.  In response, and in defiance of the judicial supervision with which they were ordered to comply, the nine met and jointly wrote a letter, published in Le Monde in early December: Why we will no longer respect the judicial restraints placed upon us.  The group's judicial supervision orders were lifted on December 18, 2009, and due to the new arrest, the group are sometimes instead described as the Tarnac Ten.

The prosecution's case was based upon police surveillance of the group, particularly the above proximity of Coupat and Lévy to a site where sabotage occurred.  Further, the group generally (and Coupat specifically) were suspected of being possible members of the Invisible Committee, an anonymous author (or authors) who wrote The Coming Insurrection, an anti-capitalist, anarchist tract originally published in 2007 which admonishes its readers to form communes and disrupt infrastructure, reminiscent of the politics and activities which the group were actually engaged in, and also of the specific crimes with which they were accused.  In particular, according to the prosecution, one passage of the book seems to directly anticipate the rail sabotage:

Over time, the prosecution's case weakened.  As the case progressed, it was asserted that the method of sabotage employed could not have caused injuries, but merely disruption.  Thierry Fragnoli, a magistrate originally assigned to the case, recused himself in April 2012.  In addition to being released from jail and having their judicial supervision lifted (despite the seriousness of the accusations), on August 7, 2015, magistrate Jeanne Duyé ordered that the specifically terrorist related charges against the group be dropped, a judgment which was upheld by the French supreme court.  On April 12, 2018, the group were acquitted of the most serious remaining charges brought against them, particularly sabotage and conspiracy, while certain members were convicted on lesser charges with minimal or no sentences.

In response to the publicity of the arrests, several philosophers came to the support of the nine, including Giorgio Agamben, Alberto Toscano, Alain Badiou, and Slavoj Žižek.  Further, several international "support committees", on behalf of the nine, "have sprung up across France and in the US, Spain, and Greece".

See also

 Anarchism
 The Coming Insurrection
 Julien Coupat
 The Invisible Committee
 Tiqqun

Notes

External links
 Not Bored! is a Situationist periodical which maintains a page on its website of materials related to the Tarnac Nine case, typically translated from French into English.
 Le Monde major French news organization Le Monde maintains an archive of its reporting on the Tarnac Nine.
 Radical Philosophy Alberto Toscano comments on the case of the Tarnac nine, and its relation to The Coming Insurrection, etc.
 Criminalising Dissent In a further piece at the Guardian, Toscano points out that the case of France's Tarnac Nine shows we are losing the political literacy to distinguish between sabotage and terrorism.

References

Quantified groups of defendants
Anarchist collectives
French anarchists
Living people
Year of birth missing (living people)